Nude, 1925 is a black and white photograph taken by Edward Weston in 1925. It holds the record for Weston's most expensive photograph after being sold for $1,609,000 at the Sotheby's New York on 8 April 2008, to Peter MacGill of the Pace-MacGill Gallery. The photograph was part of the Quillan Collection of Nineteenth and Twentieth Century Photographs, which was then auctioned.

History and description
Weston did several female nudes at the time, where it is patent an attempt to unite photographic realism with a new approach, contemporary art inspired. The picture depicts a nude female body, lying in the ground, of which only the torso is seen, from a frontal perspective. Only the undulated shapes of the body create the illusion of an abstract form, akin to a natural landscape. The model was most likely Miriam Lerner, who was Weston's lover at the time.

Public and private collections
Three known prints of this photograph are in existence. The first was auctioned in 2000 by Sotheby's. The one that was auctioned in 2008 has the artist's signature and date. A third print is held at the Metropolitan Museum of Art, in New York.

References

1925 in art
Black-and-white photographs
Nude photography
1920s photographs
Photographs by Edward Weston
Photographs of the Metropolitan Museum of Art